Golah Jar (also Romanized as Golah Jār) is a village in Dorudfaraman Rural District, in the Central District of Kermanshah County, Kermanshah Province, Iran. At the 2006 census, its population was 221, in 38 families.

References 

Populated places in Kermanshah County